Terra senza tempo is a 1950 Italian film directed by Silvestro Prestifilippo.

Cast
Barbara Berg
Leonardo Cortese
Jone Frigerio as Baroness Capuana
Achille Millo
Aldo Silvani
Peppino Spadaro
Liliana Tellini
Adriana Mafrici Mariuccia

External links
 

1950 films
Italian drama films
1950s Italian-language films
1950s Italian films